Social Hygiene is a Canadian comedy film, directed by Denis Côté and released in 2021. The film stars Maxim Gaudette as Antonin, a petty thief who is confronted by five different women — his sister Solveig (Larissa Corriveau), his wife Eglantine (Évelyne Rompré), his love interest Cassiopée (Ève Duranceau), a tax inspector (Kathleen Fortin) and theft victim Aurore (Éléonore Loiselle) — about the need to get his life back on track.

The film's trailer, released in February 2021, consists entirely of footage of the main cast in period dress, standing some distance apart in a field without any spoken dialogue. Although the actual film does feature dialogue, it does unfold largely with the actors standing at significant distance from each other and being shot with a fixed-location camera. Côté has noted, however, that while this complies with the social distancing requirements during the COVID-19 pandemic, the film had actually been written before such restrictions were imposed; he has, however, acknowledged that he had considered the script incomplete and not ready to enter production, and decided to make the film only after Corriveau convinced him that the production limitations imposed by the pandemic made it viable.

The film premiered in the Encounters program at the 2021 Berlin Film Festival, where Côté was cowinner of the award for Best Director in the program alongside Ramon Zürcher and Silvan Zürcher for The Girl and the Spider. The film had its Canadian premiere at the Rendez-vous Québec Cinéma, before opening commercially in May.

Cast 

 Larissa Corriveau as Solveig
 Maxim Gaudette as Antonin
 Evelyne Rompré as Eglantine
 Kathleen Fortin as Rose
 Eve Duranceau as Cassiopée
 Éléonore Loiselle as Aurore

References

External links

2021 films
Canadian comedy films
Films shot in Quebec
Films directed by Denis Côté
2021 comedy films
2020s French-language films
French-language Canadian films
2020s Canadian films